Wordpower, Vol. 2: Directrix is the third album by Divine Styler, released in 1999 on Mo' Wax. This was his first album released in seven years, his last being 1992's Spiral Walls Containing Autumns of Light. However, this album could be considered more as a sequel to his debut album, Word Power, due to the "Vol. 2" in the album's name and because of the more straightforward hip hop the album contains when compared to the wildly experimental Spiral Walls. This album features Divine Styler's Original Scheme Team member(s) Cokni O'Dire (only on the re-released version) and Bilal Bashir.

The album was later re-released in 2000 on Toy's Factory with an alternative cover, and an altered track listing.

Track listing

Personnel
Mark Richardson - main artist, executive producer, producer (tracks: 1-12, 14, 16-18), recording (tracks: 1-7, 9-17)
Otis Olivier Lyjasu Williams - guest vocals (tracks: 8, 12)
Takbir Bashir - guest vocals (tracks: 14, 16)
Ryan Maginn - guest vocals (tracks: 14, 16)
Hitomi Okuno - guest vocals (tracks: 2, 10)
Gola Jaisv Richardson - guest vocals (track 15)
Exceed - guest vocals (track 17)
Quin - guest vocals (track 18)
Bilal Bashir - producer (tracks: 13, 15, 19-20)
Nazareth Nirza - scratches (tracks: 6, 11, 13, 19-20)
John Tejada - scratches (track 4)
Shawn Berman - mixing, recording (tracks: 8, 18)
Ben Drury - artwork
Sølve Sundsbø - photography

References

1999 albums
Mo' Wax albums
Divine Styler albums
Sequel albums